Glenn Anthony Bruce Howard (born 13 April 1976) is a male high jumper from New Zealand. He competed at the 2000 Summer Olympics where he finished tied for 27th place.

Personal bests

International competitions

References

1976 births
Living people
New Zealand male high jumpers
Athletes (track and field) at the 2000 Summer Olympics
Olympic athletes of New Zealand
Athletes from Christchurch